"Sentimental Ol' You" is a song written by Bob DiPiero and Pat McManus, and recorded by American country music artist Charly McClain.  It was released in November 1983 as the first single from the album The Woman in Me.  The song reached #3 on the Billboard Hot Country Singles & Tracks chart.

Chart performance

References

1984 singles
Charly McClain songs
Songs written by Bob DiPiero
Epic Records singles
1984 songs
Songs written by Pat McManus (songwriter)